George Bell (1761-1843) was an advocate and activist for the education rights of African Americans. In 1807, he co-founded the Bell School, the first school for African Americans in Washington, D.C.

Life 
Bell was born into slavery in Virginia. His wife, Sophia Browning, purchased his freedom while she was also enslaved. Bell worked as a carpenter in Washington, D.C. and used his wages to purchase his wife's freedom.

Education advocacy 
Bell could not read or write. He believed that education should be accessible for African Americans and became an activist in this area. Bell co-founded and built a one-story school house with Nicholas Franklin and Moses Liverpool, two free African American men who were also formerly enslaved. Their school, the Bell School, was located in the Capitol Hill neighborhood. The original Bell School closed after few years due to a lack of funding. The school is considered Washington D.C.'s first school for African Americans.

Bell co-founded the Resolute Beneficial Society, a society that supported health, education, and burial needs of Washington D.C.'s Black community. The society successfully re-opened the Bell School in 1818.

Death 
Bell died in Washington, D.C. in 1843.

References 

1761 births
1843 deaths
19th-century American educators
African-American educators
Activists from Washington, D.C.
Educators from Washington, D.C.
Founders of schools in the United States
Free Negroes